Raquel Freire (born 22 June 1973, in Porto) is a Portuguese film director, screenwriter and novelist.

In 2014 she released the film Transiberic Love which is a love story set in modern times showing how one can be an activist within globalised social media and still have some integrity.

Works

Films
Rio Vermelho
Rasganço (2001)
Veneno Cura (2008)
Vida Queima (2013)

Novel
Trans Iberic Love (2013)

References

External links

21st-century Portuguese women writers
1973 births
Living people
People from Porto
Portuguese women film directors
Portuguese women novelists
Women screenwriters
21st-century screenwriters